Söderköpingsån is a river in Sweden.

References

Rivers of Östergötland County